The S series is the rolling stock of light metro used on Line 3 Scarborough, part of the subway system of Toronto, Ontario, Canada. They were built from 1983 to 1986 for the Toronto Transit Commission (TTC) by the Urban Transportation Development Corporation (UTDC) in Millhaven, Ontario. The trains use UTDC's proprietary linear motor-based Intermediate Capacity Transit System (ICTS, now branded as Bombardier Innovia Metro) and are its Mark I model, which is also used by the Vancouver SkyTrain and the Detroit People Mover. They consist of 14 married pair sets (28 cars total) with fleet numbers 3000 to 3027, and are not compatible with the trains on other Toronto lines, which use conventional motors.

Test runs took place in 1984 and full service began in 1985. When the line opened, 12 sets operated individually as two-car units. In 1986, two more sets were added, allowing sets to be coupled to form four-car units as ridership grew. All trains operate automatically without human intervention. Although they are capable of unmanned operations, as in Vancouver and Detroit, the TTC opted to use one-person train operation on all Line 3 trains.

Since the retirement of the remaining H-series trains in 2014, the S-series trains have been the oldest in operation on the entire subway system. They are also the only TTC rapid transit trains with a painted livery since the G series, consisting of a unique lowercase "rt" logo, referring to the line's original name of "Scarborough RT". Since 2015, the cars have been undergoing refurbishment and the addition of blue shrink wrap on their exterior to prolong their lifespan until the Line 2 Bloor–Danforth subway extension to Scarborough City Centre is complete, which will result in the shutdown of Line 3 and the retirement of the S-series trains.

References

Toronto rapid transit passenger equipment
Transport in Scarborough, Toronto
Electric multiple units of Canada